Barbara Matera (born 9 December 1981) is an Italian television announcer, actress and Member of the European Parliament for the centre-right People of Freedom party.

Biography
Barbara Matera was born on 9 December 1981 in Lucera in Italy. She studied Educational Sciences at the University of Rome La Sapienza.

In 2000, she was a participant at the Miss Italia Italian beauty contest.

Later, in September 2003, she became an announcer for Rai Uno, the primary television station of RAI, Italy's state-owned national public service broadcaster.  She remained with RAI until 2007.

In 2003, she appeared in the film Ma che colpa abbiamo noi, directed by and starring Carlo Verdone.  In 2007, she starred in the role of a journalist in the Rai Uno miniseries La Terza verità, led by Stefano Reali.  After that, she held the role of Francesca Rossini on the seventh season of Carabinieri, broadcast on Canale 5, and guest starred in an episode of Don Matteo.  In 2009, she appeared in the Canale 5 television film Due mamme di troppo, directed by Antonello Grimaldi.

European Parliament election
Barbara Matera's candidacy for Member of the European Parliament was presented by Silvio Berlusconi's party, The People of Freedom, in the 2009 European Parliament elections.

She was elected at the European Parliament with 129,994 preference votes.

Barbara Matera is the winner of the Women's Rights and Gender Equality Award, 2017.

Filmography

Film

Television

References

External links
 
 

1981 births
Living people
Italian actresses
Italian television presenters
Sapienza University of Rome alumni
The People of Freedom MEPs
Forza Italia (2013) politicians
MEPs for Italy 2009–2014
MEPs for Italy 2014–2019
21st-century women MEPs for Italy
Italian women television presenters